Howard Mark Lorber (born September 8, 1948) is an American businessman and investor.

Early life and education
Lorber was born to a Jewish family in The Bronx, the son of Charles and Celia (née Benrubi) Lorber but grew up in Paramus, New Jersey. He attended Long Island University where he is currently on the board of trustees. Lorber Hall was named in his honor. While he was in college, Lorber joined The Alpha Epsilon Pi fraternity.

Career
He is the President and CEO of Vector Group Ltd., a holding company. He is also the Chairman of Douglas Elliman, a subsidiary of Vector, which is the largest residential real estate brokerage in the New York metropolitan area with 4,000 brokers as of 2014 (and an additional 300 in Florida).

Lorber is chairman of fast food chain Nathan's Famous.

In May 2010, he became a member of the Board of Directors at Borders Group Inc.

Personal life
He is married to Thea Hallman. His son Michael Lorber is a real estate broker at Douglas Elliman and was featured on Million Dollar Listing New York. Lorber served as one of the top economic advisers to Donald Trump's 2016 presidential campaign.

References

Living people
1948 births
American chief executives of food industry companies
American financiers
American investors
20th-century American Jews
American real estate businesspeople
Businesspeople from New Jersey
Businesspeople from New York City
Long Island University alumni
People from Paramus, New Jersey
People from the Bronx
Private equity and venture capital investors
20th-century American businesspeople
21st-century American Jews